James Patton Anderson (February 16, 1822 – September 20, 1872) was an American slave owner, physician, lawyer, and politician, most notably serving as a United States Congressman from the Washington Territory, a Mississippi state legislator, and a delegate at the Florida state secession convention to withdraw from the United States. He also served in the American Civil War as a general in the Confederate States Army, serving in the Army of Tennessee.

Early life and career
James Patton Anderson was born near Winchester in Franklin County, Tennessee. He is the son of Col. William P. and Margaret L. (Adair) Anderson. As a young boy, he moved with his family to Kentucky in 1831, where he lived for most of his childhood, and then to Mississippi in 1838. He attended the medical school of Jefferson College in Canonsburg, Pennsylvania in 1840, before a family financial crisis forced him to withdraw a short time before graduation in 1842. Soon after his return home, Anderson began practicing medicine.

He studied law at Montrose Law School in Frankfort, Kentucky, and was admitted to the bar in 1843, establishing a practice in Hernando in DeSoto County, Mississippi. He also entered the state's militia forces with the rank of captain in 1846. He later served in the Mexican–American War, commanding the 2nd Battalion, Mississippi Rifles with the rank of lieutenant colonel as of February 22, 1848. That July he was mustered out of the volunteer service.

Anderson later entered politics, serving in the Mississippi House of Representatives and befriending Jefferson Davis, a fellow former Mississippi volunteer officer in the U.S. Army. He also found work as a gold prospector. When Davis became Secretary of War under President Franklin Pierce, he appointed Anderson as U.S. Marshal for the Washington Territory. Anderson relocated there to Olympia and served as marshal for several years before being selected to represent the territory in the 34th Congress as a Democrat.

After his two-year term, concerned that the Union was collapsing, he moved back to the South to the state of Florida. His aunt Ellen Adair White Beatty, who owned the "Casa Bianca" plantation outside Monticello in Jefferson County, Florida, invited him and his family to live at the plantation and manage it for her. He was an active participant in the Florida state secession convention.

American Civil War
Just prior to the start of the American Civil War, Anderson was appointed a captain in the Florida Militia on January 11, 1861. Soon after Florida's secession, Anderson was one of three deputies (delegates) from Florida to the Provisional Congress of the Confederate States, beginning February 4 and resigned on May 2. He accepted a commission as the Colonel of the 1st Florida Infantry on April 1, and initially served under Braxton Bragg in Pensacola. There he commanded the 2nd Brigade in the Army of Pensacola from October 12 to January 27, 1862.

He was promoted to the rank of Brigadier general on February 10, 1862, and was assigned to the Western Theater, commanding a brigade in the Battle of Shiloh in April. He fought with the Army of Tennessee during the battles of Perryville, Stones River, Chickamauga, and Chattanooga, before being promoted to Major general on February 17, 1864.

After briefly serving as commander of the Confederate District of Florida, Anderson returned to the field in July 1864 during the Atlanta Campaign. He led a division in Leonidas Polk's Corps in the Army of Tennessee at the battles of Ezra Church, Utoy Creek, and in the early stages of the Battle of Jonesboro before suffering a serious jaw wound on the evening of August 31. Temporarily unfit for duty, he was relieved of his command and sent home to Monticello.

He later returned to duty in April 1865 during the Carolinas Campaign, against his physicians' orders, and served with his men for the remainder of the war until their surrender to federal forces at Greensboro, North Carolina, in the spring of 1865. He was paroled on May 1, and would be pardoned by the U.S. Government on December 2, 1866.

Later life
Following the war, Anderson resided in Memphis, Tennessee, although he faced difficulty working due to his injuries sustained during the war. He sold insurance for a while and eventually became the editor of a small agricultural newspaper. He was collector of delinquent state taxes for Shelby County.

Anderson died in relative poverty at his home in Memphis at the age of 50, due primarily to lingering effects of his old war wound. He was buried there in the city's Elmwood Cemetery, Memphis, Tennessee.

See also
 List of American Civil War generals

Notes

References
 Eicher, John H., and David J. Eicher, Civil War High Commands. Stanford: Stanford University Press, 2001. .
 Hewitt, Lawrence L. "James Patton Anderson." In The Confederate General, vol. 1, edited by William C. Davis and Julie Hoffman. Harrisburg, PA: National Historical Society, 1991. .
 Linedecker, Clifford L., ed. Civil War, A-Z: The Complete Handbook of America's Bloodiest Conflict. New York: Ballantine Books, 2002. .
 Raab, James W. J. Patton Anderson, Confederate General: A Biography. Jefferson, N.C.: McFarland & Co., 2004.
 Sifakis, Stewart. Who Was Who in the Civil War. New York: Facts On File, 1988. . 
 Sketch of General Anderson's Life, Special Collections, Robert Manning Strozier Library, Florida State University, Tallahassee, Florida.
 Warner, Ezra J. Generals in Gray: Lives of the Confederate Commanders. Baton Rouge: Louisiana State University Press, 1959. .

External links
 
 The James Patton Anderson Papers at the University of Florida
 

1822 births
1872 deaths
19th-century American politicians
American military personnel of the Mexican–American War
Confederate States Army major generals
Delegates to the United States House of Representatives from Washington Territory
Deputies and delegates to the Provisional Congress of the Confederate States
Farmers from Tennessee
Members of the Mississippi House of Representatives
Mississippi lawyers
People from Franklin County, Tennessee
People of Florida in the American Civil War
Signers of the Confederate States Constitution
Signers of the Provisional Constitution of the Confederate States
Tennessee lawyers
United States Army officers
United States Marshals
Washington (state) Democrats
Washington & Jefferson College alumni
19th-century American lawyers